Llanocetidae is an extinct family of ancient toothed baleen whales from the Eocene. It was named by American paleontologist Edward Mitchell in 1989 after describing the Antarctic Llanocetus, but a 2018 study by paleontologists  Ewan Fordyce and Felix Marx included the Peruvian Mystacodon and an undescribed New Zealand specimen OU GS10897.

References

Baleen whales
Eocene cetaceans
Fossil taxa described in 1989